Aasumetsa is a village in Haljala Parish, Lääne-Viru County, in northeastern Estonia. It lies on the right bank of the Loobu River.

References

Villages in Lääne-Viru County